Doublethink is a process of indoctrination in which subjects are expected to simultaneously accept two conflicting beliefs as truth, often at odds with their own memory or sense of reality. Doublethink is related to, but differs from, hypocrisy.

George Orwell coined the term doublethink (as part of the fictional language of Newspeak) in his 1949 dystopian novel Nineteen Eighty-Four. In the novel, its origins within the citizenry is unclear; while it could be partly a product of Big Brother's formal brainwashing programs, the novel explicitly shows people learning doublethink and Newspeak due to peer pressure and a desire to "fit in," or gain status within the Party—to be seen as a loyal Party Member. In the novel, for someone to even recognize—let alone mention—any contradiction within the context of the Party line is akin to blasphemy, and could subject that person to disciplinary action and the instant social disapproval of fellow Party Members.

Like many aspects of the dystopian societies reflected in Orwell's writings, Orwell considered doublethink to be a feature of Soviet-style totalitarianism.

In Nineteen Eighty-Four
According to Nineteen Eighty-Four by George Orwell, doublethink is:

To know and not to know, to be conscious of complete truthfulness while telling carefully constructed lies, to hold simultaneously two opinions which cancelled out, knowing them to be contradictory and believing in both of them, to use logic against logic, to repudiate morality while laying claim to it, to believe that democracy was impossible and that the Party was the guardian of democracy, to forget whatever it was necessary to forget, then to draw it back into memory again at the moment when it was needed, and then promptly to forget it again, and above all, to apply the same process to the process itself—that was the ultimate subtlety: consciously to induce unconsciousness, and then, once again, to become unconscious of the act of hypnosis you had just performed. Even to understand the word—doublethink—involved the use of doublethink.Orwell, George (1949). Nineteen Eighty-Four. Martin Secker & Warburg Ltd, London, part 1, chapter 3, pp 32

Orwell explains that the Party could not protect its near-absolute power without degrading its people with constant propaganda. Yet knowledge of this brutal deception, even within the Inner Party itself, could lead to the implosion of the State. Although Nineteen Eighty-Four is most famous for the Party's pervasive surveillance of everyday life, this control means that the population of Oceania—all of it and including the ruling elite, but in practice largely excluding the proles—could be controlled and manipulated merely through the alteration of everyday thought and language. Newspeak is the method for controlling thought through language; doublethink is the method of directly controlling thought.

Earlier in the book, doublethink is explained as being able to control your memories, to be able to manually forget something, then to forget about forgetting. This is demonstrated by O'Brien, during the time when Winston Smith is being tortured toward the end of the book.

Newspeak incorporates doublethink, as it contains many words that create assumed associations between contradictory meanings, especially true of fundamentally important words such as good and evil, right and wrong, truth and falsehood, and justice and injustice.

The demand for doublethink was especially difficult on employees of the Records Department in the Ministry of Truth. The department's responsibility was to falsify historic records, even recent ones, by means of rewrite and deletion, all so that the Party could maintain the illusion that everything it had ever said and done was perfect and consistent. Yet, despite their direct role in this systematic deception, these same workers were still expected to believe the most recently created version of history, or face severe penalty if they failed. As revealed in Goldstein's Book, the Ministry's name is itself an example of doublethink: the Ministry of Truth is really concerned with lies. The other ministries of Airstrip One are similarly named: the Ministry of Peace is concerned with war, the Ministry of Love is concerned with torture, and the Ministry of Plenty is concerned with starvation. The three slogans of the Party—War is Peace, Freedom is Slavery, and Ignorance is Strength—are also examples.

Moreover, the self-deception of doublethink allows the Party to maintain huge goals and realistic expectations:

Thus each Party member could be a credulous pawn but would never lack relevant information, the Party being both fanatical and well informed and thus unlikely either to "ossify" or "grow soft" and collapse. Doublethink would avoid a "killing the messenger" attitude that could disturb the Command structure. Thus doublethink is the key tool of self-discipline for the Party, complementing the state-imposed discipline of propaganda and the police state. These tools together hide the government's evil not just from the people but from the government itself—but without the confusion and misinformation associated with primitive totalitarian regimes.

Doublethink is critical in allowing the Party to know what its true goals are without recoiling from them, avoiding the conflation of a regime's egalitarian propaganda with its true purpose.

Paradoxically, during the long and harrowing process in which the protagonist Winston Smith is systematically tortured and broken, he contemplates using doublethink as the ultimate recourse in his rebellion—to let himself become consciously a loyal party member while letting his hatred of the party remain an unconscious presence deep in his mind and let it surface again at the very moment of his execution so that "the bullet would enter a free mind" with which the Thought Police would not have a chance to tamper again.

Usage after Nineteen Eighty-Four 
Since 1949 (when Nineteen Eighty-Four was published), the word doublethink has become synonymous with relieving cognitive dissonance by ignoring the contradiction between two world views—or even of deliberately seeking to relieve cognitive dissonance. Some schools of psychotherapy such as cognitive therapy encourage people to alter their own thoughts as a way of treating different psychological maladies (see cognitive distortions).

Orwell's doublethink is also credited with having inspired the commonly-used term doublespeak, which itself does not appear in the book. Comparisons have been made between doublespeak and Orwell's descriptions on political speech from his essay "Politics and the English Language", in which "unscrupulous politicians, advertisers, religionists, and other 'doublespeakers' of whatever stripe, continue to abuse language for manipulative purposes."

See also 
Other concepts derived from Nineteen Eighty Four:

2 + 2 = 5
Crimestop
Groupthink
List of Newspeak words
Memory hole
Thoughtcrime
Similar concepts in politics:

 Alternative facts
 Big lie
 Reality-based community

Notes

References

External links
 "From 1984 to One-Dimensional Man." by Douglas Kellner
 Commentary by Karen von Hardenberg of The Trincoll Journal

Barriers to critical thinking
Cognitive dissonance
Fictional elements introduced in 1949
George Orwell
Nineteen Eighty-Four
Propaganda techniques
Words originating in fiction